The 2018 Big 12 Championship Game was a college football game played on Saturday, December 1, 2018, at AT&T Stadium in Arlington. This was the 17th Big 12 Championship Game and determined the 2020 champion of the Big 12 Conference. The game featured the top-seeded, Oklahoma Sooners and the second-seeded, Texas Longhorns. Sponsored by soft drink company Dr Pepper, the game was known as the Dr Pepper Big 12 Championship Game.

The game marked the first time since 1903 that Texas and Oklahoma played each other twice in the same season. In addition, it was first meeting between the two since 1923 that was not held in Dallas. The game broke the Conference Championship attendance record, which was previously held by the 1992 SEC Championship Game.

Previous season
The 2017 Big 12 Championship Game was the first since the conference's realignment. Televised nationally by Fox, the game featured the Oklahoma Sooners and the TCU Horned Frogs. This was Oklahoma's ninth appearance and was TCU's first appearance. In the regular season, Oklahoma defeated TCU, 38–20. In a rematch between the two teams, Oklahoma won the Big 12 Championship over TCU, 41–17, for its 47th conference title.

Teams
The 2018 Championship game was contested by Oklahoma and Texas. Texas defeated Oklahoma 48–45 in their regular season match-up in Dallas.

Texas Longhorns

Oklahoma Sooners

Game summary

Statistics

See also
 List of Big 12 Conference football champions

References

External links
 Game statistics at statbroadcast.com

Big 12 Championship Game
Big 12 Championship Game
Texas Longhorns football games
Oklahoma Sooners football games
Red River Showdown
American football in the Dallas–Fort Worth metroplex
Big 12 Championship Game
Big 12 Championship Game